Edey is a suburb located in the province of Christ Church, Barbados. Edey is located just by the Frere Pilgrim and Ridgeview.

References 

Populated places in Barbados